The Sumathi Best Television Children's Program Award is presented annually in Sri Lanka by the Sumathi Group of Campany associated with many commercial brands for the best Sri Lankan television children's program of the year in television screen.

The award was first given in 2011. Following is a list of the winners of this prestigious title since then.

Awards

References

Awards established in 2011
2011 establishments in Sri Lanka